Salele is a village in East Timor located in the suco of Lalawa in the Tilomar Administrative Post (formerly called subdistrict) of the Cova Lima Municipality. It is the location of the second main border crossing between the East Timor and Indonesia. The checkpoint on the Indonesian side of the border is called the Motamasin checkpoint.

Geography
Salele is located on the southern coastline of Timor island, at the southwesternmost corner of East Timor. It is located just east of the Mota Masin River which forms the East Timor-Indonesia border.

Transportation
The village is served by the main road linking Suai, 25 km to the east, with the town of Betun, the capital of Malaka Regency which is located 30 km to the west across the border in Indonesia.

Border crossing
The Salele integrated frontier checkpoint is located just east of the Motamasin River which forms the East Timor-Indonesia border. The checkpoint on the Indonesia side is the Motamasin border crossing checkpoint.

The checkpoint was newly built to cater to cross border traffic after East Timor became independent and opened by Vice Prime Minister Jose Luis Guterres on 26 June 2012. This is the main border crossing for the southern coast of East Timor, linking Suai city with the West Timor cities of Betun and Besikama.

External links
 Immigration Department of East Timor website

References

Populated places in East Timor
Cova Lima Municipality
East Timor–Indonesia border crossings